Ronald Elliot-Wilson (17 April 1907 – 5 July 1954) was a South African cricketer. He played in four first-class matches for Border from 1928/29 to 1934/35.

See also
 List of Border representative cricketers

References

External links
 

1907 births
1954 deaths
South African cricketers
Border cricketers